4836 Medon  is a large Jupiter trojan from the Greek camp, approximately  in diameter. It was discovered on 2 February 1989, by American astronomer Carolyn Shoemaker at the Palomar Observatory in California. The dark asteroid has a rotation period of 9.82 hours and belongs to the 60 largest Jupiter trojans. It was named after the mythological Greek warrior Medon.

Orbit and classification 

Medon is a Jovian asteroid orbiting in the leading Greek camp at Jupiter's  Lagrangian point, 60° ahead of the Gas Giant's orbit in a 1:1 resonance (see Trojans in astronomy). It is a non-family asteroid in the Jovian background population.

It orbits the Sun at a distance of 4.6–5.8 AU once every 11 years and 11 months (4,339 days; semi-major axis of 5.21 AU). Its orbit has an eccentricity of 0.11 and an inclination of 19° with respect to the ecliptic.

Naming 

This minor planet was named by the discoverer after Medon (Phylace's Medon), the illegitimate son of Oileus and half-brother of Ajax the Lesser. Medon was exiled for having killed a relative of his stepmother Eriopis. In the Trojan War, he was killed by Aeneas before the Greek ships.

The official naming citation was published by the Minor Planet Center on 25 August 1991.

Physical characteristics 

Medon is a generically assumed C-type asteroid. Many if not most Jupiter trojans possess an even darker D or P-type spectrum.

Rotation period 

In May 1991, observations by Stefano Mottola using the now decommissioned ESO 1-metre telescope at ESO's La Silla Observatory in Chile gave a rotation period of 9.838 hours at an amplitude of 0.24 magnitude. Follow-up observations were made in 1992 and 2009 – in order to rule out any alternative period solutions, as the irregular lightcurve showed additional maxima and minima – gave a concurring period of 9.840 hours with a brightness variation of 0.31 magnitude.

In April 2014, another rotational lightcurve was obtained by Robert Stephens and Daniel Coley at the Center for Solar System Studies in California in collaboration with Linda French from Illinois Wesleyan University. Lightcurve analysis gave a well-defined rotation period of 9.818 hours with an amplitude of 0.27 magnitude.

Diameter and albedo 

According to the surveys carried out by the Japanese Akari satellite, the Infrared Astronomical Satellite IRAS, and the NEOWISE mission of NASA's Wide-field Infrared Survey Explorer, Medon measures between 63.28 and 78.70 kilometers in diameter and its surface has an albedo between 0.045 and 0.070. The Collaborative Asteroid Lightcurve Link adopts the results obtained by IRAS, that is, an albedo of 0.061 and a diameter of 67.73 kilometers based on an absolute magnitude of 9.5.

Notes

References

External links 
 Asteroid Lightcurve Database (LCDB), query form (info )
 Dictionary of Minor Planet Names, Google books
 Discovery Circumstances: Numbered Minor Planets (1)-(5000) – Minor Planet Center
 
 

004836
004836
Discoveries by Carolyn S. Shoemaker
Named minor planets
19890202